Eastland Independent School District is a public school district based in Eastland, Texas (USA).

In addition to Eastland, the district also serves the town of Carbon.

In 2009, the school district was rated "academically acceptable" by the Texas Education Agency.

History
On July 1, 1990, the district absorbed the Carbon Independent School District.

Schools 
Eastland High School (Grades 9-12)
Eastland Middle School (Grades 6-8)
Siebert Elementary School (Grades PK-5)
2006 National Blue Ribbon School

References

External links 
 Eastland ISD

School districts in Eastland County, Texas